The Hyundai Smartstream is a gasoline and diesel automobile engine branding used by Hyundai since 2018. An all-aluminum engine of Hyundai Motor Company debuted in the third-generation Hyundai i30 hatchback (codenamed PD), which was unveiled in 2018 in Paris Motor Show.

Gasoline engines

Smartstream G1.0 (G3LD) 
It has been developed from the Kappa family.

Applications
Hyundai Casper (AX1) (2021–present)
Hyundai i10 (AC3) (2020–present)
Kia Picanto/Morning (JA) (2020–present)

Smartstream G1.0T (G3LE/G3LF) 

Applications
Hyundai Bayon (BC3 CUV) (2021–present)
Hyundai i10 (AC3) (2020–present)
Hyundai i20 (BC3) (2020–present)
Hyundai i30 (PD) (2020–present)
Hyundai Kona (OS) (2020–present)
Kia Ceed (CD) (2020–present)
Kia Picanto (JA) (2020–present)
Kia Stonic (YB CUV) (2020–present)

Smartstream G1.2 (G4LF) 

Applications
Hyundai Bayon (BC3 CUV) (2021–present)
Hyundai i20 (BC3) (2020–present)
Kia Picanto (JA) (2020–present)
Kia Rio (YB) (2020–present)
Kia Sonet (QY) (2020–present)
Kia Stonic (YB CUV) (2020–present)

Smartstream G1.4T (G4LD) 

Applications
Hyundai Elantra (CN7) (2020–present)
Kia Carens (KY) (2022–present)
Kia Seltos (SP2i) (2019–present)

Smartstream G1.5 (G4FL/G4LG)

Developed from the Gamma family, it is also marketed as the 1.5 Smartstream Gamma II engine.

It is produced by Kia Slovakia in Žilina.

Applications (G4FL)
Hyundai Accent/Verna (HCi) (2020–present)
Hyundai Creta/ix25 (SU2c/SU2i/SU2id) (2019–present)
Hyundai Elantra (CN7) (2020–present)
Hyundai Stargazer (KS) (2022–present)
Hyundai Verna (BN7) (2023–present)
Kia Carens (KY) (2022–present)
Kia K3 (BD) (2018–present)
Kia Seltos/KX3 (SP2i/SP2c) (2019–present)
Kia Sonet (QY) (2020–present)

Applications (G4LG)
 Hyundai i30 (PD) (2020–present)

Smartstream G1.5T (G4LH/G4FS)
It is produced by Kia Slovakia in Žilina.

The engine is based on the Smartstream G1.5 MPi (G4FL) engine from the Gamma family, and mainly used in the Chinese market.

Applications (G4LH)
Hyundai Alcazar (SU2 LWB) (2023–present)
Hyundai i30 (PD) (2020–present)
Hyundai Verna (BN7) (2023–present)
Kia Ceed (CD) (2020–present)
Kia Carens (KY) (2023-present)

 Applications (G4FS) 
Hyundai Custo (KU) (2021–present)
Hyundai Mistra (DU2) (2020–present)
Hyundai Sonata (DN8) (2020–present)
Hyundai Tucson (NX4) (2021–present)
Kia K5 (DL3) (2020–present)
Kia Sportage Ace (NP) (2021–present)

Smartstream G1.6 (G4FM)

 Applications (MPi) 

 Hyundai Elantra (AD) (2018–2020)
 Hyundai Elantra (CN7) (2020–present)
 Hyundai Venue (QX) (2019–present)
 Kia Forte/Cerato/K3 (BD) (2018–present)

 Applications (DPi) 

 Hyundai Accent/Verna (HC) (2019–2022)
Hyundai Venue (QX) (2019–present)

Smartstream G1.6T (G4FP)
The Smartstream G1.6 T-GDI replaced the 1.6 Gamma T-GDI engine. It is a  turbocharged inline 4-cylinder engine with GDi that carries a bore and stroke of 75.6 mm and 89 mm respectively and a 10.0(±0.2):1 compression ratio. This is the world's first production engine to use Continuously Variable Valve Duration (CVVD) technology, allowing it to adjust how long its intake valves remain open independently of timing and lift. Hyundai claims a 4% increase in performance, 5% increase in efficiency, and a 12% decrease in tailpipe emissions due to this technology.

 Applications 

Hyundai Elantra (CN7) (2020–present)
Hyundai Kona (OS) (2020–2023)
Hyundai Kona (SX2) (2023–present)
Hyundai Sonata (DN8) (2019–present)
Hyundai Tucson (NX4) (2020–present)
Hyundai i20 N (BC3) (2021–present)
Kia K5 (DL3) (2019–present)
Kia Seltos (SP2) (2022–present)
Kia Sportage (NQ5) (2021–present)

Smartstream G2.0 (G4NJ/G4NL/G4NM/G4NS)

 Applications (G4NJ/G4NL) 
Hyundai Alcazar (SU2 LWB) (2021–2023)
Hyundai Creta (SU2b) (2021–present)
Hyundai Elantra (CN7) (2020–present)
Hyundai Sonata (DN8) (2019–present)
Hyundai Tucson (NX4) (2021–present)
Kia K5 (DL3) (2019–present)
Kia Sportage (NQ5) (2021–present)

 Applications (G4NM) 
Hyundai Sonata (DN8) (2019–present)
Kia K5 (DL3) (2019–present)

 Applications (G4NS) 
Hyundai Elantra (CN7) (2020–present)
Hyundai Kona (OS) (2020–2023)
Hyundai Kona (SX2) (2023–present)

Smartstream G2.0T (G4NN)
It is built by Hyundai Wia Shandong.

 Applications 
Hyundai Custo (KU) (2021–present)
Hyundai Sonata (DN8) (2019–present)
Kia Carnival (KA4) (2021–present)
Kia K5 (DL3) (2020–present)

Smartstream G2.5 (G4KM/G4KN)

 Applications (G4KM)
Hyundai Santa Fe (TM) (2020–present)
Hyundai Sonata (DN8) (2019–present)
Kia Sorento (MQ4) (2020–present)

 Applications (G4KN)
Hyundai Grandeur/Azera (IG) (2019–2022)
Hyundai Grandeur/Azera (GN7) (2022–present)
Hyundai Santa Cruz (2021–present)
Hyundai Santa Fe (TM) (2020–present)
Hyundai Sonata (DN8) (2019–present)
Hyundai Tucson (NX4) (2020–present)
Kia K5 (DL3) (2019–present)
Kia K8 (GL3) (2021–present)
Kia Sorento (MQ4) (2020–present)

Smartstream G2.5T (G4KP)

 Applications 

 Hyundai Santa Cruz (2021–present)
 Hyundai Santa Fe (TM) (2020–present)
 Hyundai Sonata (DN8) (2020–present)
 Kia K5 (DL3) (2020–present)
 Kia Sorento (MQ4) (2020–present)

Smartstream FR G2.5T (G4KR)

 Applications 

Genesis G80 (RG3) (2020–present)
Genesis GV70 (JK1) (2020–present)
Genesis GV80 (JX1) (2020–present)
Kia Stinger (CK) (2020–present)

Smartstream G3.5 (G6DT/G6DU)
The Smartstream G3.5 is a 6-cylinder engine for FWD based applications.

 Applications (G6DT)
Hyundai Grandeur/Azera (GN7) (2022–present)
Kia Carnival (KA4) (2020–present)
Kia K8 (GL3) (2021–present)

 Applications (G6DU)
Hyundai Santa Fe (TM) (2020–present)
Hyundai Staria (US4) (2021–present)
Kia Carnival (KA4) (2020–present)
Kia Sorento (MQ4) (2020–present)

Smartstream FR G3.5T (G6DS)

The thermostat was upgraded to an ITM unit and the high pressure pump pressure was increased from 200 bar to 250 bar. The intercooler was upgraded to a water-cooled unit from an air cooler unit, which increases the unique responsiveness of the turbocharger. Finally the Smartstream FR G3.5T is rated ULEV50 for emissions versus the ULEV70 rating for the 3.3L Lambda II RS T-GDi.

This engine is currently exclusive to Genesis, a subsidiary of Hyundai.

 Applications 
Genesis G80 (RG3) (2020–present)
Genesis GV70 (JK1) (2020–present)
Genesis GV80 (JX1) (2020–present)
Genesis G90 (RS4) (2021–present)

Smartstream FR G3.5T e-S/C (G6DV)

 Applications 
Genesis G90 (RS4) (2022–present)

Hybrid engines

Smartstream G1.6 Hybrid/Plug-in Hybrid (G4LE/G4LL)

The Smartstream G1.6 GDI Plug-in Hybrid (G4LE) combines a Smartstream G1.6 engine,   electric motor and a 12.9KWh battery.

 Applications (G4LE)
Hyundai Elantra Hybrid (CN7) (2020–present)
Hyundai Kona (OS) (2020–2023)
Kia K3 Hybrid (BD) (2020–present)
Kia Niro Hybrid (DE) (2016–2021)

 Applications (G4LL)
Hyundai Kona (SX2) (2023–present)
Kia Niro Hybrid (SG2) (2021–present)

Smartstream G1.6T Hybrid/Plug-in Hybrid (G4FT/G4FU)

 Applications 
Hyundai Grandeur/Azera Hybrid (GN7) (2022–present)
Hyundai Santa Fe Hybrid (TM) (2020–present)
Hyundai Tucson Hybrid (NX4) (2020–present)
Kia K8 Hybrid (2021–present)
Kia Sorento (MQ4) (2020–present)
Kia Sportage (NQ5) (2021–present)

Smartstream G2.0 Hybrid (G4NR)

 Applications 
Hyundai Sonata Hybrid (DN8) (2019–present)
Kia K5 Hybrid (DL3) (2020–present)

LPG engines

Smartstream L2.0 (L4NB)

 Applications 
Hyundai Sonata (DN8) (2019–present)
Kia K5 (DL3) (2019–present)
Kia Sportage (NQ5) (2022–present)

Smartstream L3.5 (L6DC)

 Applications 
Hyundai Grandeur (GN7) (2022–present)
Hyundai Staria (US4) (2021–present)
Kia K8 (GL3) (2021–present)

Diesel engines

Smartstream D1.5
It belongs to the Hyundai U engine family.

 Applications 

Hyundai Alcazar (SU2 LWB) (2021–present)
Hyundai Creta (SU2) (2020–present)
Hyundai i20 (BI3) (2020–present)
Hyundai Venue (QXi) (2020–present)
Hyundai Verna (HCi) (2020–present)
Kia Carens (KY) (2022–present)
Kia Seltos (SP2i) (2019–present)
Kia Sonet (QY) (2020–present)

Smartstream D1.6 (D4FE)

The Smartstream D1.6 features a new integrated thermal management system and is lighter than its predecessor thanks to an engine block constructed from aluminum.

 Applications 

Hyundai i30 (PD) (2019–present)
Hyundai i40 (2018–2019)
Hyundai Kona (OS) (2020–present)
Hyundai Tucson (TL) (2018–2020)
Hyundai Tucson (NX4) (2020–present)
Kia Ceed (CD) (2019–present)
Kia K3 (BD) (2018–present)
Kia Sportage (QL) (2018–2021)
Kia Sportage (NQ5) (2021–present)
Kia Stonic (YB CUV) (2018–present)

Smartstream D2.0 (D4HD)

 Applications 

Hyundai Tucson (NX4) (2020–present)
Kia Sportage (NQ5) (2021–present)

Smartstream D2.2 (D4HE/D4HH)

The Smartstream D2.2 features an aluminium block versus the older R II 2.2L engine and therefore it is 38 kg lighter, the engine compression ratio is 16.0:1 and the fuel pressure was increased to 2,200 bar. The engine switched back to a timing belt instead of a timing chain.

Applications
Hyundai Santa Fe (TM) (2020–present)
Kia Carnival (KA4) (2020–present)
Kia Sorento (MQ4) (2020–present)

Smartstream FR D2.2 (D4HF)

Applications
Genesis G80 (RG3) (2020–2021)
Genesis GV70 (JK1) (2020–present)

Smartstream D3.0 (D6JA)

This engine is 32 kg lighter than its predecessor and friction is reduced by water-cooled technology Intercooler. EGR and SCR system is applied to reduce the fuel consumption and fuel pressure was increased from 1,800 bar to 2,200 bar.

 Applications 

 Genesis GV80 (JX1) (2020–present)

See also

 List of Hyundai engines

References

External links
 Official press releases

Smartstream
Straight-four engines
Straight-six engines
V6 engines
Gasoline engines by model